Dick Jones (born January 21, 1942) is an American politician. He served as a Republican member for the 52nd district in the Kansas House of Representatives from 2015 to 2017.

References

1942 births
Living people
Republican Party members of the Kansas House of Representatives
21st-century American politicians